The Universal Wrestling Federation was a professional wrestling promotion based in Oklahoma City, Oklahoma from 1979 to 1987. Former employees in the UWF consisted of professional wrestlers, managers, play-by-play and color commentators, announcers, interviewers and referees.

Alumni

Male wrestlers

Female wrestlers

Midget wrestlers

Stables and tag teams

Managers and valets

Commentators and interviewers

Referees

Other personnel

References
General

Specific

External links

MidSouthFan.com
Universal Wrestling Federation alumni at Cagematch.net
Universal Wrestling Federation alumni at OWW.com
Universal Wrestling Federation alumni at Wrestlingdata.com

Universal Wrestling Federation alumni